Peoria is a hamlet in northern Alberta, Canada within Birch Hills County, located  south of Highway 49, approximately  northeast of Grande Prairie.

Demographics 
Peoria recorded a population of 12 in the 1986 Census of Population conducted by Statistics Canada.

See also 
List of communities in Alberta
List of hamlets in Alberta

References 

Birch Hills County
Hamlets in Alberta